Filio ni doma is a novel by Slovenian author Berta Bojetu. It was first published in 1990.

Plot 
The novel is divided into three parts and each tells the story of one of the main characters, namely Helene Brass, her granddaughters Filio and Uria. However, all three stories are inextricably linked, so after reading in your head, we put together the whole story. The story takes place on an unnamed island, which creates a sense that it could be here and now. Only by the names of some people (Mare, Kate, Lukrija, etc.) can we imagine a Dalmatian island, which has been hinted at by literary historians, namely Mljet. After the shipwreck, 42-year-old Helena Brass, her unnamed daughter and a boy named Helena Uri find themselves on this island. Helena gets to know life and the unusual and cruel rules of the island in the new area. Namely, women and men are separated, the former live in the Upper Town, the latter in the Lower, and all are in charge of their tasks. The residents are dressed in costume, wash clothes, take care of food and children, and men work in the vineyards, fish market, fish. We are immediately shown the subordinate position of women, as they do not have the right to decide, they do not socialize with each other as in "normal" societies, there is even torture and cruel punishment of disobedient women (sodomistic rape). In addition, they are shown as a kind of "womb" for childbirth, as men come to them night after night, and even more cruel is that each of them is visited by a different man each time (they systematically take care of these night visits). Thus, reproduction is taken care of, everything is fixed, even a violent termination of pregnancy is allowed. Daughters can stay with their mothers and suffer the same fate as all women, and boys from the age of eight onwards are taken and taken to the Lower Town, where they are prepared for their life's tasks and work. All this is in favor of the "normal" functioning of the island, which is owned by a man from the mainland. His orders are carried out by the Island Commander. As a person who is not from here, Helena finds it difficult to get used to a new life, to rules that deprive her of her freedom and take away her dignity. However, he tries to change things for the better as he prepares women to clean their houses together, open a laundry and even a school.  All of this leads to the punishments she has to endure, but she has protection from the Commander, who is her lover. Her daughter gives birth to Filio, but does not care for her, so Helena takes care of it. He also raises Uriah, who is then taken to the Lower Town and raised to be the new governor of the island, and this resists the sensitive boy as he sees the cruel things happening near him. His only bright spot is Filio, because of which she insists and who also visits her at night when her time (sexual maturity) comes. Although she doesn’t know who he is, she develops feelings for him and bows to life on the island. However, she becomes pregnant and her pregnancy is forcibly terminated, so she decides to flee to the mainland. Uri is left alone and some time after she becomes the manager, he too goes after her. Filio lives life on the mainland, becomes a painter, organizes exhibitions, and meets Uri there. He returns to the island when Helena is ill and buries her after her death. It is also strong enough then to resist past lives and memories. As well as the island and the rules on it are changing and more and more people are leaving it.

See also
List of Slovenian novels

Slovenian novels
1990 novels